The 2009 Levene Gouldin & Thompson Tennis Challenger was a professional tennis tournament played on outdoor hard courts. It was the sixteenth edition of the tournament which was part of the 2009 ATP Challenger Tour. It took place in Binghamton, New York, United States, between 10 and 16 August 2009.

Singles main-draw entrants

Seeds

 Rankings are as of August 3, 2009.

Other entrants
The following players received wildcards into the singles main draw:
  Prakash Amritraj
  Lester Cook
  Cecil Mamiit
  Blake Strode

The following players received a Special Exempt into the main draw:
  Tim Smyczek

The following players received entry from the qualifying draw:
  Luigi D'Agord
  Laurynas Grigelis (as a Lucky Loser)
  Ryan Harrison
  Roy Kalmanovich
  Tigran Martirosyan (as a Lucky Loser)
  Igor Sijsling

Champions

Singles

 Paul Capdeville def.  Kevin Anderson, 7–6(7), 7–6(11)

Doubles

 Rik de Voest /  Scott Lipsky def.  Carsten Ball /  Kaes Van't Hof, 7–6(2), 6–4

External links
Official website
ITF Search 
ATP Vault
2009 Draws